What Is a Woman? is a 2022 American online film about gender and transgender issues presented by conservative political commentator Matt Walsh, released by The Daily Wire, and directed by Justin Folk. The film features Walsh asking various people "What is a woman?" and arguing for his views. Walsh said it was made in opposition to "gender ideology".

The film was released to subscribers to The Daily Wire website on June 1, 2022, at the beginning of Pride Month. It had a divided reception; Walsh's approach was praised by some commentators, but criticized by some others who described it as transphobic. Trans activists said Walsh had tried to trick people into participating in the film under false pretenses. Walsh's tour to screen the film on college campuses set off protests.

Summary
The film features Walsh asking "What is a woman?" and related questions to a variety of people, including politicians, a pediatrician, a gender studies professor, a psychiatrist, a gender-affirming family and marriage therapist, a transgender opponent of medical transition for minors, a surgeon who specializes in gender-affirming surgery, a father of a 14-year-old transgender boy, and media personality, psychologist, and author Jordan Peterson. Walsh also discusses the terms "non-binary" and "transgender" with a Maasai tribe in Kenya and interviews a gay man practicing public nudity in San Francisco. The film discusses sex reassignment surgery, puberty blockers, transgender youth, and transgender athletes in women's sports.

It features a speech given by Walsh at a meeting of the Loudoun County School Board that was called so people could express their opinions on Policy 8040, which would allow transgender students to use their preferred name and pronouns as well as allow the students to use school bathrooms and locker rooms that align with their gender identity. During the speech, Walsh says: "You are all child abusers. You prey upon impressionable children and indoctrinate them into your insane ideological cult, a cult which holds many fanatical views but none so deranged as the idea that boys are girls and girls are boys."

At the end of the film, Walsh's wife defines a woman as "an adult human female, who needs help opening this", handing a jar to Walsh.

Production 

Walsh said he made What Is a Woman? because he did not think anyone had been able to answer its titular question after a tweet he had made four years prior. According to Walsh, during the production, "Most of the people we talked to either didn't want to talk about it or they appeared to be confused about something as simple as what a woman is." Asked how he would define a woman, Walsh said "An adult human female" and "I would have given an answer that is biological because that is 100% the answer." Walsh also said, "I think gender ideology can be beaten because it cannot withstand any scrutiny at all. And so all it requires is us to have a little bit of boldness, to look at it in the face and ask some basic questions." Walsh said he wanted to talk to people he disagreed with to get the answers he sought.

In February 2022, Eli Erlick, a transgender activist, alleged that Walsh had invited dozens of people to participate in the film under false pretenses. Kataluna Enriquez, Fallon Fox, and several other transgender public figures corroborated the account. Walsh created a group called the Gender Unity Project, which the activists said attempted to lure them into participating in the film. The Gender Unity Project's Twitter account and website were taken down shortly after the allegations were made. Erlick claimed there were at least 50 other recruited interviewees, including a 14-year-old transgender girl.

Release

What Is a Woman? was released for subscribers to The Daily Wire website on June 1, 2022, to coincide with the beginning of Pride Month.

The Daily Wire said it was hit with a distributed denial of service (DDoS) attack during the premiere. An article by The Daily Dot cast doubt on the DDoS claim, noting previous technical problems with the website.

On June 14, Walsh published a book and self-narrated audiobook based on the film, titled What Is a Woman?: One Man's Journey to Answer the Question of a Generation, through DW Books, The Daily Wire'''s publishing branch.

In September 2022, The Daily Dot reported that event management website Eventbrite was refusing to allow users to use its platform to show the film, citing violations of its community guidelines, including the prohibition of hateful content regarding sexual orientation and gender identity. On September 7, Walsh accused the website of refusing screenings since July and said that "It is absolutely ludicrous and indefensible to categorize our film as 'hate speech'". Many fans of Walsh accused Eventbrite of censorship. Walsh also accused Eventbrite of hypocrisy for permitting the screening of drag shows.

Walsh screened the film on his What Is a Woman? college tour at the University of Houston on October 13, 2022. Police estimated that 435 people attended, with 400 protesters (including transgender rights activists) and counter-protesters outside. A screening by Walsh at the University of Wisconsin also was met by protesters.

 Reactions 
In May 2022, a transgender man alleged that Walsh used a topless image from his Instagram account in What Is a Woman? without his permission. Twitter refused a request to take down a trailer containing the image.

On June 6, 2022, Walsh claimed that he received death threats and had the police involved after the release of the film.

Texas state representative Matt Schaefer, a Republican, promoted the film, encouraging his Twitter followers to "Ask your Senator or Representative if they have watched".

 Reception 
According to AJ Eckert of Science-Based Medicine, the film "has been widely advertised by pundits, traditional media, and social media platforms opposed to gender-affirming care and especially the use of pronouns, restrooms, and locker rooms" aligning with trans people's gender identities.

 Positive 
Rich Lowry of National Review wrote that, while he had only watched clips of What Is a Woman?, they were "mesmerizing and extremely disturbing." Rod Dreher of The American Conservative argued that the film shows that Walsh had "the courage to ask the questions and demand the answers" from his opponents. Kaylee McGhee White of the Washington Examiner said that the film reveals "the effort to erase the female identity and objective truth ... harming individuals, their families, and communities." Leor Sapir of City Journal compared the film to other books and movies that "sparks a demand for social reform", such as Ralph Nader's Unsafe at Any Speed, and said that it "has been virtually ignored by the left-of-center media." Karol Markowicz of the New York Post praised the film for "expos[ing] the lunacy of pro-trans extremism", calling it "a cross between Michael Moore's 1989 documentary Roger & Me where the filmmaker pursued General Motor's CEO Roger Smith, and the Borat movies in which Sacha Baron Cohen pretends to be clueless journalist Borat Sagdiyev from Kazakhstan making films about American culture." Author and journalist Matt Taibbi said that Walsh "tries and fails to get trans activists, academics, and medical professionals to offer a definition of womanhood" and in doing so, he "pranks the pants off America's silliest intellectuals." Transgender YouTuber and political commentator Blaire White praised the film in The Spectator Australia.

Dante James of Film Threat gave it a rating of 8 out of 10, calling it "a deep dive into the conversation of 'are Trans women real women' and, more importantly, does biology matter anymore." James asserted that "Many so-called 'film critics' chose not to review What Is A Woman for fear of backlash from the LGBTQIA+ community. I want to call these people out as cowards."

Laura Dodsworth of The Critic argued that the film's "success lies in its determined pursuit of the answer to one question", but criticized it for not "interrogat[ing] the meaning of gender as much as it could". Debbie Hayton of The Spectator argued that it shows "The naivety of the gender identity brigade", but said that "while Walsh is critical of gender identity ideology, he did not explain why such a bizarre idea has captivated society." Nina Power of Compact said that "The documentary presents a searing and unforgettable indictment of today's gender ideology that should rouse action across the political spectrum.", but added that "Walsh's framing doesn't always do justice to the possibilities of such a cross-partisan alliance in defense of woman, man, and reality." Jo Bartosch of Spiked called it "a must-watch documentary" that "captures a strange moment in time when politicians, clinicians and the corporate world are gleefully promoting the lie that humans can change sex", but criticized it for ignoring the contributions of feminists who have been critical of the transgender movement, including Helen Joyce, Kathleen Stock, Abigail Shrier, and Janice Raymond. Christian Toto, a film critic and contributor to The Daily Wire, wrote that "Walsh's elementary question leads to larger, disturbing queries", but said the film "could use some hard data, along with more experts" and empathy towards transgender people.

Movieguide called it "Lively, provocative, informative, and brilliant" with an entertainment rating of four stars. Samuel Sey of The Christian Post called the film "both hilarious and haunting" and "truly fantastic", adding that "Walsh's infamous ability to maintain an impeccable level of satire and seriousness is what makes [the documentary] so compelling." Erika Ahern of CatholicVote.org said that "While [the documentary] is about exposing the culture of 'sexual justice' for what it truly is, it is more profoundly a film about Pilate's last question to Christ, 'What is truth?' And it's about what happens when we answer, 'I am my own truth.'" Amy Welborn of The Catholic World Report called the film "well-produced, amusing, and frustrating", but said that Walsh "fails to drill down into the more potent questions for his topic". Mathew De Sousa of The Catholic Weekly said it "provides a fair scope of both leftist and conservative beliefs on core gender issues", but that it "could be a more robust resource for Christians if a little more time was given to those arguments against gender ideology and the transgender agenda." Brett McCracken of The Gospel Coalition praised it for a "basic but brilliant narrative concept", but added that "a bit more empathy could have strengthened Walsh's case", criticizing his "name-calling" of transgender people as "not a great tactic in persuasion, nor in evangelism."

Ann Schneible of the National Catholic Register gave the film a "B+", praising "how easily it breaks through the cognitive dissonance exhibited by supporters of gender ideologies and their inability or unwillingness to answer the simplest questions on this topic." and opined that "Walsh's interview style works well in this context.", but criticized the film for its "stylistic and narrative choices" and criticized The Daily Wire for limiting its distribution by putting it "behind a paywall on the Daily Wire site.", while also opining that doing so "gives the appearance that they intend to be exclusionary".

Kai Burkhardt of the German newspaper  Die Welt called Walsh a "conservative Michael Moore" and praised the film for stirring up America's "gender war" by efficiently asking seemingly effortless questions to supposed experts in the field, who are unable to answer.

 Negative 
Claire Goforth of The Daily Dot called What Is a Woman? transphobic and argued that "Duplicity is central to the creation of this documentary". John Kendall Hawkins of CounterPunch called the film "more conservative silliness", concluding that it "just adds to the relentless white noise we can't seem to escape and adds nothing to our humanity. The film is not worth watching, but its posture is worth noting." Malcolm Harris of Intelligencer argued that the film is a part of "The right's dangerous 'just asking questions' anti-trans campaign", concluding that "The plan is working: This year's Pride month looks to have a casualty count. If Walsh and his ilk are successful, next year's will be higher. They're begging for it." Nathan J. Robinson of Current Affairs argued that the film shows "Conservative Ignorance" and treats "cruel, mindless prejudices ... as 'common sense'", concluding that "Debunking this stuff is easy.", but that "Slick propaganda like What Is A Woman? will cause real harm to trans people, and while I generally consider censorship counterproductive, we should not understate the toxicity of a film like this." Katie Kadue of Gawker opined that "For Walsh and other patrollers of the gender boundary, trans women are a contamination risk. They stand accused of infiltrating not only physical women's spaces like bathrooms and locker rooms but also the clean conceptual space of the category 'woman': they are, according to this transphobic logic, men who fraudulently claim to be women." Moises Mendez II of Rolling Stone also called the film transphobic and argued that it represents an "essentialist ideology". Mendez criticized social media companies for allowing The Daily Wire to feature advertisements of the film on their platforms, saying that "the ease with which the Daily Wire is allowed to promote this project through ads across multiple platforms is telling of the social media companies' priorities during Pride month — or any month."

AJ Eckert of Science-Based Medicine called the film "every bit as much of a science-denying propaganda film disguised as a documentary as antivax films like VAXXED or the anti-evolution film Expelled!, and such films tend to be potent messaging tools", concluding that "Walsh clearly did not set out to honestly seek answers to a perplexing question, even if they are complex. Instead, he started with a conclusion and then sought out sources to support that conclusion, no matter how dubious the source, making this film an exercise, not in honest truth-seeking but rather motivated reasoning."

Erin Rook of LGBTQ Nation called the film "propaganda" that is "full of transphobic lies", adding that "Walsh paints a frightening image of mutilated children and confused professionals — of an immoral ideology threatening the Western Christian way of life", and that it "provides ammunition for those who seek to deprive transgender people of access to affirming and life-saving healthcare." Gwendolyn Ann Smith of the Bay Area Reporter and co-founder of the Transgender Day of Remembrance argued that "The point of the film, of course, is to paint transgender people and those who support us as deluded, foolish, or both", concluding that "people like Walsh want to paint us as monsters rather than people." Eli Erlick, founder of the organization Trans Student Educational Resources, told Rolling Stone that "to believe what's in [the documentary] requires a fantastical hatred of trans people" and that it shows an "appalling lack of research on the trans community".

Dimitrije Vojnov of Radio Television of Serbia said that Walsh could become the American Right's equivalent of Michael Moore, and just as biased. Sasha Stone of Awards Daily said that the documentary is "more or less a profile of Matt Walsh" that "reflects his past year of asking the question to activists, 'what is a woman' since apparently this is a difficult thing to explain."

 Mixed 
Jennifer Graham of Deseret News said that Walsh "may be trolling all of us with the film," but that "he could be asking the question that turns the culture war." Jason Whitlock of Blaze Media called the film "great" and its ending "clever", but criticized it for not mentioning God or Christianity, saying that "It fights a spiritual war on secular terms" and that "Before we answer 'what is a woman,' we need to relearn the meaning of being Christian." Adam Zivo of the Canadian newspaper The National Post praised the film for "reveal[ing] activist absurdity", but said it "ultimately fails" because "Walsh seems more interested in capturing 'gotcha' moments with his interviewees" and argued that Walsh used "bad-faith storytelling to rile up audiences while oversimplifying complex issues." Zoran Janković of the Serbian magazine Vreme praised it for acting as a "complementary counterpoint" to films on the other side of the LGBT debate and praised Walsh's presentation, but also argued that it was "in its ... essence a propaganda work".

See also
 Transgender rights in the United States
 Anti-gender movement
 Johnny the Walrus, a children's book written by Walsh which depicts being transgender as pretending to be a walrus.
 When Harry Became Sally: Responding to the Transgender Moment'', a book critical of the modern transgender movement by socially conservative philosopher Ryan T. Anderson.

References

External links 
 
 
 

2022 films
2022 documentary films
2022 LGBT-related films
American documentary films
American LGBT-related films
Transgender-related documentary films
LGBT-related controversies in film
LGBT-related controversies in the United States
Film controversies in the United States
Conservative media in the United States
Transgender in the United States
Films shot in Kenya
Films shot in San Francisco
2020s English-language films
2020s American films